Justo José de Urquiza was an Argentine general and politician.

Urquiza, a Basque surname, may also refer to:

Places 
General Urquiza, a village and municipality in Misiones Province, Argentina
Villa Urquiza, a neighborhood of Buenos Aires
Villa Urquiza, Entre Ríos, a town in Entre Ríos Province, Argentina
Parque Urquiza (Rosario), a public urban park in Rosario, Argentina

Transport 
Ferrocarril General Urquiza, a commuter train line in northeast Argentina
General Justo José de Urquiza Airport, Paraná, Entre Ríos Province, Argentina
Rua General Urquiza, Rio de Janeiro, Brazil

Sports 
JJ Urquiza, a sports club sited in Loma Hermosa, Tres de Febrero, Greater Buenos Aires, Argentina
UAI Urquiza, a sports club sited in Villa Lynch, General San Martín Partido, Greater Buenos Aires, Argentina

People 
Manolo Urquiza (1920–1987), media personality in Cuba and Puerto Rico
Nicolás Urquiza (born 1969), Argentine artist and designer

Other 
11711 Urquiza, main-belt asteroid

Basque-language surnames